Lisa De Leeuw (born July 3, 1958) is an American former pornographic actress.

Career
She appeared in over 200 films and was inducted into both the X-Rated Critics' Organization Hall of Fame and the AVN Hall of Fame. 
She also appeared in magazine spreads for pornographic magazines such as Genesis, Hustler, and Swank in the early 80s.

Alleged death
She has been widely reported to be dead, but due to the underground nature of the adult industry in the era in which she was active, her true identity and current status are not verifiable.  In the 2000 book Skinflicks: The Inside Story of the X-Rated Video Industry, writer and porn producer David Jennings describes the stigma and rumors surrounding AIDS in the porn community in the late 1980s and early 1990s.  He wrote: "Reputed to be dead of AIDS, Lisa DeLeeuw and Brandy Alexandre, now out of the industry, proclaimed themselves alive and healthy." However, in 2003, another publication, Headpress 25, claimed that De Leeuw died of complications from AIDS on November 11, 1993.

Awards
 1981 CAFA Award for Best Supporting Actress – Amanda by Night
 1982 CAFA Award for Best Supporting Actress – Blonde Heat
 1985 AVN Award for Best Supporting Actress—Film – Dixie Ray, Hollywood Star
 1986 AVN Award for Best Supporting Actress—Film – Raw Talent

See also

 Golden Age of Porn

References

External links
 
 
 

American female adult models
American pornographic film actresses
People from Moline, Illinois
Pornographic film actors from Illinois
Living people
1958 births